Xie Fang (born November 1, 1935) is a Chinese actress and author. She is best known for her involvement with pre-Cultural Revolution cinema.

Life and career
Xie was born in Huangpi, Hubei, China and grew up in Shanghai. Both of her parents were teachers at a Christian school. Her parents became increasingly involved with the Communist Party of China; this would influence her career by acting in more "revolutionary" plays like The White Haired Girl. She graduated from an all-girls' high school in 1951, and started acting shortly after. She joined acting troupe SOUTH backstage and began singing in the opera. Xie married in 1957. In 1959, Xie starred in Song of Youth; this was her break out role. She signed with Beijing Film Studio in 1963. Xie, then, would star in the Xie Jin film Two Stage Sisters in 1964. She was the recipient of the Golden Phoenix Award in 1995 for her contributions to Chinese cinema. 

In addition to being an actress, Xie is also an author.

Selected filmography 
The Chinese Widow (2017)
Love Will Be Back (2015)
Woman-Taxi-Woman (1991)
This Man Is Dangerous (1985) 
Two Stage Sisters (1964)
Early Spring in February (1963)
Song of Youth (1959)

Bibliography
Gone Hastily (往事匆匆, 1997) 
Unsinkable Lake : Chinese Modern Fiction Film (不沉的湖: 中国现代影视小说, 1997)

See also 
 Cinema of China

References

External links 
 
 Xie Fang at the Chinese Movie Database
 
 

1935 births
Living people
Chinese film actresses
Actresses from Wuhan
Writers from Wuhan
Chinese television actresses
20th-century Chinese actresses
21st-century Chinese actresses